Artina Tinsley Hardman (born July 13, 1951) is a former member of the Michigan House of Representatives.

Early life
Hardman was born on July 13, 1951.

Education
Hardman graduated from Detroit School of Nursing and earned an associate degree from Wayne County Community College.

Career
Hardman was a licensed practical nurse and a health care supervisor. On November 3, 1998, Hardman was elected to the Michigan House of Representatives where she represented the 3rd district from January 13, 1999, to 2004.

Personal life
Hardman is a member of the NAACP. Hardman is a member of the African Methodist Episcopal Church.

References

Living people
1951 births
American women nurses
African-American nurses
Wayne County Community College District alumni
Women state legislators in Michigan
African-American women in politics
African-American state legislators in Michigan
Democratic Party members of the Michigan House of Representatives
20th-century African-American women
20th-century African-American politicians
21st-century African-American women
21st-century African-American politicians
20th-century American women politicians
20th-century American politicians
21st-century American women politicians
21st-century American politicians